Palangabad Rural District is in Palangabad District of Eshtehard County, Alborz province, Iran. The National Census of 2006 counted 6,613 people in 1,903 households, at which time it was in Karaj County, Tehran province.  At the most recent census of 2016, it had a population of 1,218 in 374 households. The largest of its 11 villages was Palangabad, with 1,012 people.

References 

Eshtehard County

Rural Districts of Alborz Province

Populated places in Alborz Province

Populated places in Eshtehard County